Anabarilius songmingensis is a species of ray-finned fish in the genus Anabarilius.

References

songmingensis
Fish described in 1980